The European section of the 1962 FIFA World Cup qualification functioned as the qualifiers for the 1962 World Cup, which took place in Chile. For an overview of the qualification rounds, see the article 1962 FIFA World Cup qualification.

Format
The 30 teams were divided into 10 groups. The groups had different rules, as follows:
Groups 1, 2, 3, 4, 5, 6 and 8 had 3 teams each. The teams played against each other on a home-and-away basis. The group winners would qualify.
Group 7 had 5 teams. The teams played in a knockout tournament, with matches on a home-and-away basis. The group winner would qualify.
Group 9 had 2 teams. The teams played against each other on a home-and-away basis. The group winner would advance to the UEFA / CAF Intercontinental Play-off.
Group 10 had 2 teams. The teams played against each other on a home-and-away basis. The group winner would advance to the UEFA / AFC Intercontinental Play-off.

Groups

Group 1

Switzerland won a playoff on a neutral ground.

Group 2

Bulgaria won a playoff on a neutral ground.

Group 3

Group 4

Group 5

Group 6

Group 7

Group 8

Czechoslovakia won a playoff on a neutral ground.

Group 9

Group 10

Inter-confederation play-offs

CAF v UEFA

UEFA v AFC

Qualified teams
The following 10 countries qualified for the 1962 FIFA World Cup

1 Bold indicates champions for that year. Italic indicates hosts for that year.
2Competed as Germany

Goalscorers

7 goals

 Andrej Kvašňák

5 goals

 Adolf Scherer
 Bobby Charlton
 Yngve Brodd
 Charles Antenen

4 goals

 Tomáš Pospíchal
 Nahum Stelmach
 Omar Sivori
 Yaúca
 Milan Galić

3 goals

 Jimmy Greaves
 Maryan Wisnieski
 Andreas Papaemmanouil
 Lajos Tichy
 Yehoshua Glazer
 Shlomo Levi
 Mario Corso
 Ady Schmit
 Billy McAdams
 Ralph Brand
 Ian St. John
 Rune Börjesson
 Metin Oktay
 Albert Brülls
 Gert Dörfel
 Uwe Seeler

2 goals

 Hristo Iliev
 Dimitar Yakimov
 Michalis Shialis
 Dieter Erler
 Ray Pointer
 Bobby Smith
 Kai Pahlman
 Jacques Faivre
 János Göröcs
 Károly Sándor
 Henk Groot
 Tonny van der Linden
 Jimmy McIlroy
 Jim McLaughlin
 José Águas
 David Herd
 Denis Law
 Alex Young
 Valentin Bubukin
 Mikheil Meskhi
 Slava Metreveli
 Viktor Ponedelnik
 Alfredo Di Stéfano
 Agne Simonsson
 Robert Ballaman
 Heinz Schneiter
 Dragoslav Šekularac

1 goal

 Roger Claessen
 Paul van Himst
 Marcel Paeschen
 Todor Diev
 Ivan Petkov Kolev
 Petar Velichkov
 Jiří Hledík
 Josef Jelínek
 Josef Kadraba
 Josef Masopust
 Peter Ducke
 John Connelly
 Ron Flowers
 Johnny Haynes
 Dennis Viollet
 Mohammed Awad
 Luciano Vassalo
 Sauli Pietiläinen
 Lucien Cossou
 Jean-Jacques Marcel
 Roger Piantoni
 Ernest Schultz
 Joseph Ujlaki
 Flórián Albert
 Máté Fenyvesi
 Tivadar Monostori
 Ernő Solymosi
 Amby Fogarty
 Johnny Giles
 Joe Haverty
 Boaz Kofman
 Shlomo Nahari
 Reuven Young
 José Altafini
 Antonio Angelillo
 Francisco Lojacono
 Camille Dimmer
 Nicolas Hoffmann
 Bjørn Borgen
 Eldar Hansen
 Roald Jensen
 Lucjan Brychczy
 Jan Szmidt
 Mário Coluna
 Eusébio
 Gennadi Gusarov
 Aleksei Mamykin
 Valery Voronin
 Enrique Collar
 Marcelino
 Joaquín Peiró
 Alfonso Rodríguez Salas
 Luis del Sol
 Torbjörn Jonsson
 Norbert Eschmann
 Rolf Wüthrich
 Aydın Yelken
 Ivor Allchurch
 Phil Woosnam
 Helmut Haller
 Richard Kreß
 Zvezdan Čebinac
 Dražan Jerković
 Tomislav Kaloperović
 Bora Kostić
 Petar Radaković

1 own goal

 Fernand Brosius (playing against Portugal)

Notes

External links 
 RSSSF.com

 
1962 FIFA World Cup qualification
FIFA World Cup qualification (UEFA)
1961–62 in European football